The Malaysian Kijang Emas is the official gold bullion coin of Malaysia and is minted by the Royal Mint of Malaysia. It was first issued on 17 July 2001. Malaysia is the 12th country in the world to issue its own gold bullion coin.

The Kijang Emas has a gold purity of 999.9 millesimal fineness or 24 karat. The coins come in denominations of RM200, RM100 and RM50 which are nominal face values, and weighs 1 oz, ½ oz and ¼ oz respectively. RM is the notation for the Malaysian ringgit.

The purchase and resale price of Kijang Emas is determined by the prevailing international gold market price.

History 
The Malaysian Kijang Emas was first minted in December 2000 by the Royal Mint of Malaysia. It was launched by the then Prime Minister of Malaysia, Tun Dr. Mahathir Mohamad on 17 July 2001. 

Malaysia is the 12th country in the world to issue its own gold bullion coin, and joins the ranks of the Canadian Gold Maple Leaf, American Gold Eagle, Australian Gold Nugget, and South African Krugerrand.

Denominations

Design 
The design on the obverse of the Kijang Emas depicts a barking deer ("kijang") in its natural habitat in the Malaysian jungle. Also appearing on the obverse are the words BANK NEGARA MALAYSIA, for the central bank of Malaysia as the issuer of the coins; KIJANG EMAS; the weight; gold purity; and the year of minting.

The reverse side features the hibiscus, the national flower of Malaysia together with the denomination face value, as well as the words BANK NEGARA MALAYSIA in Jawi (Arabic) script.

Pricing 
The purchase and resale price of Kijang Emas is determined by the prevailing international gold market price. For example, on 18 January 2008, the coins are offered for sale at RM3,052, RM1,555 and RM792 for 1 oz, ½ oz and ¼ oz respectively, when the price of gold in the market was US$879 (RM2,916) per troy ounce.

The Kijang Emas is retailed by Maybank in Malaysia.

References

External links 
Bank Negara Malaysia
Kijang Emas Daily Market Price

Bullion coins of Malaysia
Gold bullion coins